The Health Education Journal is a peer-reviewed academic journal that covers the field of health education. It was established in 1943 and is published by SAGE Publications The editor-in-chief is Peter Aggleton (University of New South Wales).

Abstracting and indexing
The journal is abstracted and indexed in:

According to the Journal Citation Reports, the journal's 2017 impact factor was 1.008, ranking it 125th out of 156 journals in the category "Public, Environmental & Occupational Health" and 165 out of 238 journals in the category "Education & Educational Research".

References

External links
 

Health education journals
Education journals
SAGE Publishing academic journals
English-language journals
Publications established in 1943
8 times per year journals